Titirangi is a former New Zealand parliamentary electorate. It existed from 1987 to 2002, with a break from 1996 to 1999. It was represented by four members of parliament, with three of them from Labour and one from National.

Population centres
The 1987 electoral redistribution took the continued population growth in the North Island into account, and two additional general electorates were created, bringing the total number of electorates to 97. In the South Island, the shift of population to Christchurch had continued. Overall, three electorates were newly created  (including Titirangi), three electorates were recreated, and four electorates were abolished. All of those electorates were in the North Island. Changes in the South Island were restricted to boundary changes.

The electorate was in the western suburbs of Auckland, and initially included the population centres of Titirangi and Laingholm. Later, the Titirangi electorate moved further east and took in the suburb of New Lynn.

History
Ralph Maxwell of the Labour Party was the electorate's first representative; he had since  represented the Waitakere electorate. In the 1993 election, Labour's Suzanne Sinclair beat the incumbent. The electorate existed until 1996, when it was replaced by the reconstituted Waitakere. Hasler defeated Sinclair in Waitakere in the 1996 election.

Hasler was defeated by Labour's David Cunliffe. In 2002, the Titirangi electorate was abolished.

Members of Parliament
Key

List MPs

Election results

1999 election

1993 election

1990 election

1987 election

Notes

References

Historical electorates of New Zealand
1987 establishments in New Zealand
1996 disestablishments in New Zealand
1999 establishments in New Zealand
2002 disestablishments in New Zealand